Plattsburgh station is an Amtrak intercity train station in Plattsburgh, New York. The station is served by one daily round trip on the Adirondack. It has one low-level side platform on the west side of the single track of the Canadian Pacific Railway Canadian Subdivision.

The Plattsburgh station was opened in 1886, previously used as a Delaware and Hudson Railway  Depot, and was designed by Albany architects Fuller & Wheeler, in the French Provincial style. It was listed on the National Register of Historic Places on November 12, 1982 as the D & H Railroad Complex.  Currently Amtrak only uses a small office downstairs at track level while the above space holds law offices, a media production business, and financial investment offices.

See also
National Register of Historic Places in Clinton County, New York

References

External links

Plattsburgh Amtrak Station (USA Rail Guide -- Train Web)

Amtrak stations in New York (state)
Former Delaware and Hudson Railway stations
Railway stations on the National Register of Historic Places in New York (state)
Transportation buildings and structures in Clinton County, New York
Railway stations in the United States opened in 1886
National Register of Historic Places in Clinton County, New York